"Making a Good Thing Better" is a song performed by Australian singer Olivia Newton-John. It was written by Pete Wingfield. It was released in June 1977 as the lead single from the Newton-John's ninth studio album of the same name and peaked at number 20 on the Easy Listening chart and number 87 on the Hot 100 in the United States.

Reception
Cash Box magazine said "Ms.Newton-John's funkiest performance to date ,and with John Farrar's creative production, it all works. Her lead vocal varies in texture and as the verses range from tender to tough, strings and backing vocal tracks could be supporting Aretha Franklin."

Track listing
 "Making a Good Thing Better" - 3:42
 "Compassionate Man" - 3:25

Charts

References

1977 songs
1977 singles
Olivia Newton-John songs